Rear Admiral Tariq Ali  was a flag officer in the Pakistan Navy and has served as the Deputy Chief of the Naval Staff (Supply), DCNS-S at Naval Headquarters in Islamabad. He took the office as Head of Supply branch of Pakistan Navy in March 2020. Before this he as also served in the field as Commander, Depot (COMDEP) in Karachi.

Biography
Tariq Ali joined the Pakistan Navy in 1982 and got commission in Supply Branch in 1986. He is a graduate of Pakistan Navy War College Lahore and National Defence University Islamabad.

Career
He served at both command and staff units throughout his career. His staff appointments and commands includes Assistant Chief of the Naval Staff,Supply (ACNS-S), Commander Depot (COMDEP), and Director Inventory Control Point (DICP). His command assignments includes senior staff officer to Commander, Karachi, Director Naval Stores, Director Surface Stores at Naval Headquarters Islamabad and staff officer for Integrated Logistic Support for F-22P Frigates.

During his previous assignment as senior staff officer to Commander, Karachi (2011–2012), he was transferred to the Karachi Naval Dockyard where he served at Controller Inventory Control Point (CICP) for almost two years. In 2014 when he was promoted to the rank of Commodore, he was appointed as the Director Inventory Control Point of Dockyard for three months.

On 1 July 2014 Commodore Tariq Ali took over the Command of Commander, Depot (COMDEP) a major and crucial type command of the supply branch located in Karachi and he remained COMDEP for two years, Afterwards he was transferred to Islamabad to complete his war course at the National Defence University from 2016 to 2017.

After completing the war course from NDU he then was transferred to naval headquarters where he was appointed as the Assistant Chief of the Naval Staff, Supply from July 2017 to November 2019. He was promoted to the rank of Rear Admiral on 3 March 2020 and is currently performing his duties as the Deputy Chief of the Naval Staff for Supply branch.

Effective dates of promotion

Awards and decorations

References

External links
Navy promotion
Naval Technology F-22P Frigates

Year of birth missing (living people)
Living people
Pakistan Navy officers